Oroya aurora is a moth in the family Dalceridae, and the only species in the genus Oroya. Both the genus and the species were first described by Scott E. Miller in 1994. It is found in southern Peru and adjacent Bolivia. The habitat consists of tropical premontane wet, tropical premontane moist and subtropical (lower) montane wet forests.

The length of the forewings is 9–10 mm. Adults are orange, with uniform deep orange forewings. Adults are on wing in January, March, May and from October to December.

Etymology
The genus name refers to La Oroya, Peru, the type locality of the type species. The specific name refers to the orange colour of a sunrise and is derived from Latin aurora.

References

Dalceridae
Moths of South America
Moths described in 1994